General Biographical Dictionary may refer to:

 Alexander Chalmers' General Biographical Dictionary
 John Gorton's General Biographical Dictionary
 John Lauris Blake's General Biographical Dictionary
 General Biographical Dictionary or General Biography of John Aikin
 New General Biographical Dictionary of Hugh James Rose